is a Japanese composer and pianist. Born in Hiroshima, Japan, she graduated from Kobe University with a degree in musical performance, and began working as a video game composer in 1998. She joined video game developer and publisher Square that same year, and worked on over 15 games for them before leaving to work as an independent composer in 2010.

Tanioka is best known for composing for the Final Fantasy Crystal Chronicles series. Tanioka has a style of "world music", whereby she combines instruments from different parts of the world into one cohesive sound. She also likes to incorporate piano music into her soundtracks, which she typically performs herself, as she has done as a part of The Star Onions, a musical group focusing on arrangements of Final Fantasy XI music as well at various concerts.

Biography

Early life
Tanioka was born in Hiroshima, Japan, where she studied music and composition while in school and enjoyed listening to video game music as her younger brother was a gamer. Among the composers she grew familiar with were Square employees Hitoshi Sakimoto, Nobuo Uematsu and Kenji Ito. Her favorite classical composers at the time were Piotr Paleczny and Hiromi Uehara. Tanioka attended Kobe University, where she studied music and joined a choir. She graduated with a degree in musical performance. Although she had planned on performing music as a career, during college she became more interested in composing than performance, and in video game composition because of her childhood experiences. After graduating, she joined Square (now Square Enix) as a composer in 1998.

Career
Her first score was the soundtrack to 1998's The Fallen Angels, by developer Steel Hearts, which she composed with Masaki Izutani. That same year, she joined Square and composed her first soundtrack for them to a game in the Chocobo series, Chocobo's Dungeon 2, with Yasuhiro Kawakami, Tsuyoshi Sekito and Kenji Ito. Her second work in the series was also her first solo soundtrack, that of Dice de Chocobo, a video game adaption of a board game. She composed for two other projects over the next two years, All Star Pro-Wrestling with Tsuyoshi Sekito and Kenichiro Fukui and Blue Wing Blitz by herself. Her first major composing role was in 2002, when she was one of three composers chosen to write the soundtrack to Final Fantasy XI. Although she did not contribute more than one song to the multiple expansions to the game, during this period she joined The Star Onions, a band made of Square Enix composers that arranges and performs Final Fantasy XI music. The group has released two albums to date.

After Final Fantasy XI, Tanioka returned to the Chocobo series to arrange her Dice de Chocobo soundtrack for the game's remake, Chocobo Land: A Game of Dice. After that, however, she composed the soundtrack to Final Fantasy Crystal Chronicles, which led to her composing the soundtracks to the other five games in the series. Between the games, she worked on the soundtracks to Code Age Commanders, Code Age Brawls, Project Sylpheed, and Final Fantasy Fables: Chocobo's Dungeon. On February 28, 2010 Tanioka announced her departure from Square Enix, following several other Square Enix composers such as Kenichiro Fukui, Junya Nakano, and Masashi Hamauzu; she joined the composer's group GE-ON-DAN with many other composers like Nakano. In 2011, she became one of the founding members of Ringmasters, a non-exclusive worldwide group of artists and composers, though she later left the group. She composed in 2011 music for iOS interactive storybooks, Snow White, The Ugly Duckling, and Hansel and Gretel, before founding her own independent company, Riquismo, in August 2012. Riquismo is not a full studio, and Tanioka continues to work independently. Tanioka has said that she decided to become a freelance composer because she wanted to write for a wider variety of subjects. Since its founding she has composed music for Ragnarok Odyssey, for which she wrote independently of any prior music from the Ragnarok series, and MA.YU.MO.RI.

Unlike the soundtracks to the numbered Final Fantasy games, no songs from the Crystal Chronicles or Chocobo soundtracks have appeared in any compilation albums produced by Square Enix. Songs from the two series have also not appeared in any of the official Final Fantasy music concerts, although "Morning Sky" from the Crystal Chronicles soundtrack was played in the first Games in Concert performance in Utrecht, Netherlands on November 26, 2006. It was performed by Floor Jansen of the band After Forever and the Metropole Orchestra.

Musical style and influences

Kumi Tanioka's signature style, especially for the Crystal Chronicles games, is that of "world music". She has described the musical style for the soundtrack to Final Fantasy Crystal Chronicles as being based on "ancient instruments". The soundtrack has extensive use of many medieval and renaissance musical instruments like the recorder, the crumhorn and the lute, creating a distinctively rustic feel, and also follows the practices and styles of medieval music. She says the idea came to her while looking at illustrations of the game world, which gave her the idea of making "world music", where the tracks would "not [be] limited to a single country or culture". She feels that specific instruments do not necessarily need to be tied to a specific geographic region, and tries to see, for example, how an Indian instrument and a Celtic instrument might work with each other.

For the soundtrack to Ring of Fates, Tanioka tried to focus on "creating a new landscape containing the same atmosphere". She returned to using instruments in an "ethnic manner" again in composing the soundtrack for Echoes of Time. The piano performances in the Ring of Fates soundtrack were done by Kumi Tanioka. She did the performances herself rather than use an outside performer as most Final Fantasy soundtracks have done primarily because she "likes to play piano", and they were done without any sheet music, as she preferred instead to improvise. She took extensive piano lessons as a child, and lists piano and choral music as the biggest influences on her musical style. She also claims to have been influenced by music from a wide variety of cultures, like Indonesian, Irish and Balinese music. Tanioka has performed live at several events, including 2011's Final Fantasy XI-themed VanaCon or 2021's  Tokyo Game Show for the Final Fantasy Crystal Chronicles Remaster; she likes to do live performances as she feels it connects her with the listener's response to her music, unlike when composing where she can only imagine audience's responses to hearing her music.

Works

Video games
The Fallen Angels (1998) – with Masaki Izutani
Chocobo's Dungeon 2 (1998) – with Yasuhiro Kawakami, Tsuyoshi Sekito, and Kenji Ito
Dice de Chocobo (1999)
All Star Pro-Wrestling (2000) – with Tsuyoshi Sekito and Kenichiro Fukui
Blue Wing Blitz (2001)
Final Fantasy XI (2002) – with Naoshi Mizuta and Nobuo Uematsu
Chocobo Land: A Game of Dice (2002)
Final Fantasy Crystal Chronicles (2003) – with Hidenori Iwasaki
Code Age Commanders (2005) – with Yasuhiro Yamanaka
Code Age Brawls (2006)
Project Sylpheed (2006) – with Junya Nakano, Kenichiro Fukui, Takahiro Nishi, and Keigo Ozaki
Final Fantasy Crystal Chronicles: Ring of Fates (2007)
Final Fantasy Fables: Chocobo's Dungeon (2008) – with Naoshi Mizuta, Junya Nakano, Masashi Hamauzu, Kenji Ito, Ai Kawashima, and Yuzo Takahashi
Final Fantasy Crystal Chronicles: My Life as a King (2008)
Final Fantasy Crystal Chronicles: Echoes of Time (2009)
Final Fantasy Crystal Chronicles: My Life as a Darklord (2009)
Final Fantasy Crystal Chronicles: The Crystal Bearers (2009) – with Hidenori Iwasaki and Ryo Yamazaki
Mario Sports Mix (2010) – with Masayoshi Soken
Half-Minute Hero: The Second Coming (2011) – with several others
Harvest Moon: A New Beginning (2012)
Ragnarok Odyssey (2012)
MA.YU.MO.RI (2013)
Super Smash Bros. for Nintendo 3DS and Wii U (2014) – arrangements with several others
Kakuriyo no Mon (2015) – (Only composed "神代より伝わりし伝承")
Airship Q (2015)
Super Smash Bros. Ultimate (2018) – arrangements with several others
Hyrule Warriors: Age of Calamity (2020) – with several others
Minecraft: Caves & Cliffs (2021) - with Lena Raine

See also
Music of the Chocobo series
Music of Final Fantasy XI
Music of the Final Fantasy Crystal Chronicles series

References

1974 births
21st-century Japanese composers
21st-century Japanese pianists
21st-century Japanese women musicians
21st-century women composers
21st-century women pianists
Japanese composers
Japanese pianists
Japanese women composers
Japanese women pianists
Kobe University alumni
Living people
Square Enix people
Video game composers